Obrh is a small settlement in the Municipality of Dolenjske Toplice in the historical region of Lower Carniola in Slovenia. The municipality is included in the Southeast Slovenia Statistical Region.

References

External links
Obrh on Geopedia

Populated places in the Municipality of Dolenjske Toplice